DPCP may refer to:

 Diphenylcyclopropenone
 DisplayPort Content Protection
 Data Protection Compliance Program